Pisidium hibernicum is a species of freshwater bivalve from the family Sphaeriidae.

Description
The 2.5-3.5mm. shell is very inflated (convex) hence the common name Globular Pea Shell. The central umbos is prominent. The periostracum (surface) is silky glossy and sculptured by fine, regular striae. In colour it is greyish to brownish white often with scattered red-brown mineral deposits.

Distribution
Its native distribution is Palearctic.

 Czech Republic – endangered (EN), endangered in Bohemia (EN), critically endangered in Moravia
 Slovakia
 Germany – endangered (gefährdet)
 Nordic countries: Denmark, Faroes, Finland, Iceland, Norway and Sweden
Great Britain and Ireland

References

External links
Pisidium hibernicum  at Animalbase taxonomy, biology,status (threats), images

hibernicum
Palearctic molluscs
Molluscs described in 1894